Saving Charlie is a novel by Aury Wallington and published by Del Rey Books, it is based on the television series Heroes. It was released on December 26, 2007 in the United States. It is 256 pages long, and was made with the full cooperation of the show's creators, although its canonicity in relation to the television series has not yet been established.

Plot introduction
The novel takes place during the first season. It chronicles the activities of Hiro Nakamura, a young man with the ability to stop time and experience time travel, after he transports himself back in time (as seen in the episode "Six Months Ago") in hopes of saving the life of Charlene "Charlie" Andrews, a waitress with enhanced memory, who Hiro has fallen in love with, but who is destined to die at the hands of super-powered serial killer, Sylar.

Characters 
Hiro Nakamura has the ability to stop time and travel through time and space. He has yet to gain control of the latter. He gets sidetracked from his mission to save the world and travels six months back in time to save Charlie.
Charlene “Charlie” Andrews has an eidetic memory and is a waitress at the Burnt Toast Diner. She plans to one day travel around the world.
Lloyd is a cop who is a regular at the Burnt Toast Diner. He and Charlie have dated in the past and has feelings for her. He also bullies Hiro.
Lynette is the manager of the Burnt Toast Diner.
Bob is the chef at the Burnt Toast Diner.
Mr. Roitz is the landlord of Hiro's apartment.
PJ is an employee at a comic bookstore at the mall. Hiro can't talk to Ando without breaking the space time continuum, so he becomes friends with PJ.
Ando Masahashi is Hiro's best friend who works with him at Yamagato Industries.
Sylar referred to as The Brain Man: a serial killer who takes  people's abilities away by cutting their head open.
Molly Walker makes a minor appearance at the Los Angeles Zoo where Hiro accidentally teleports.
James Walker is another victim of Sylar. Hiro accidentally teleports to a morgue and sees his body. He is Molly Walker's father.

Reference Characters 
These are characters that are talked about at some point in the novel and in flashbacks but do not necessarily appear in the story.

Kaito Nakamura is Hiro's dad, the focus of many flashbacks. He and Hiro are very different and usually avoid each other but Hiro finds they have more in common than he thinks.
Kimiko Nakamura is Hiro's sister who also appears in flashbacks.
Isaac Mendez is the author of the comic book, 9th Wonders! and another of Sylar's victims. Hiro refers to the time when he accidentally teleported to New York City and finds his body in his apartment.
Takezo Kensei is a Bushido Samurai warrior from the 17th century whom Hiro refers to many times.
Robogirl is a character from Hiro's favorite manga series by the same name. She is a female robot with weapons for hands. According to Hiro, she resembles Charlie in a lot of ways.
Tami Oyoki is referred to as the girl who came close to having a relationship with Hiro in the past. She was Kimiko's best friend and was only nice to Hiro because he was "her friend's geeky little brother".
Miyoki Akayawa was a girl Hiro had asked out in the past but was rejected.
Barbie Travis was a waitress at the Burnt Toast diner in 1976. She was murdered by her ex-boyfriend, Merle Eckels. Hiro meets her in person when he accidentally teleports to that time and also witnesses Merle's execution for the murder.
Aunt Erika is Charlie's aunt whom she is close to. She was Charlie's guardian as she was growing up and has also worked at the Burnt Toast Diner.

2007 American novels
Heroes (American TV series)
Novels based on television series
Superhero novels
Del Rey books